Nosipho Makamba-Botya is a South African politician who served as a Member of the Western Cape Provincial Parliament for the Economic Freedom Fighters (EFF). She became an MPP in May 2019 and served as the party's chief whip. Makamba-Botya was also the deputy chairperson of the EFF in the province.

On 28 January 2023, Makamba-Botya alongside fellow EFF MPP Melikhaya Xego resigned from the provincial parliament. She was subsequently sworn in as a City of Cape Town councillor on 14 February 2023.

References

External links

Living people
Year of birth missing (living people)
Economic Freedom Fighters politicians
21st-century South African politicians
21st-century South African women politicians
Members of the Western Cape Provincial Parliament
Women members of provincial legislatures of South Africa